Rômulo Duncan Arantes Neto (born April 9, 1987) is a Brazilian actor.

Career 
In 2007, he was the male protagonist of the fourteenth season of Malhação. Later, he was called by Rede Record and participated in Os Mutantes: Caminhos do Coração as Telê, a mutant bandit league, remaining with the role in Mutantes: Promessas de Amor.

In 2013, he signed a contract with Rede Globo to perform in Sangue Bom, playing his first villain, Tito Rabelo. In 2014, he was considered for two roles, and eventually assumed the role of Roberto, who was originally Klebber Toledo, in Império.

Personal life
He has dated Lise Grendene, and the soap opera director, Amora Mautner. In 2013, he took up a relationship with actress Cléo Pires.

Filmography

Television

Film

Theater

Awards and nominations

References

External links

 
 

1987 births
Living people
21st-century Brazilian male actors
Male actors from Rio de Janeiro (city)
Brazilian male telenovela actors
Brazilian male film actors
Brazilian male stage actors